The Township of Ops was a municipality located in the centre of the former Victoria County, now the city of Kawartha Lakes. The township contained the communities of Reaboro and Fleetwood, and also surrounded the largest population centre in the county, Lindsay.

See also
List of townships in Ontario

Ops
Former township municipalities in Ontario